Secret is the soundtrack album for the 2007 Taiwanese romance film, Secret, directed and co-written by Jay Chou and starring Chou, Gwei Lun-mei, Anthony Wong, and Alice Tzeng. The album was produced by Chou, released on 13 August 2007 by JVR Music and Sony Music Taiwan.

The album was nominated a Golden Horse Award for Best Original Film Score and won a Golden Horse Award for Best Original Film Song for "Secret". The album was also nominated for three Golden Melody Awards and won for Best Instrumental Album Producer and Best Instrumental Composer.

The track, "Secret", is listed at number 2 on the 2007's Hit FM Top 100 Singles of the Year.

Track listing

Awards

References

External links
  Jay Chou discography@JVR Music

2007 albums
Mandopop soundtracks
Jay Chou albums
Sony Music Taiwan albums